Twilight Dreams is an album by Lester Bowie recorded for the UK based Venture label and the third album by his "Brass Fantasy" group. It was released in 1987 and features performances by Bowie, Vincent Chancey, Frank Lacy, Steve Turre, Malachi Thompson, Rasul Siddik, Stanton Davis, Bob Stewart, and Phillip Wilson.

Reception
The Allmusic review by Scott Yanow awarded the album 3 stars, stating, "one imagines that this approach works better in concert than on record. There are some strong moments on this hard-to-find LP (such as Bowie's trumpet-drums duet with Phillip Wilson on "Duke's Fantasy") but this is a hit-and-miss affair".

Track listing
 "I Am With You" - 7:35
 "Personality" (Harold Logan, Lloyd Price) - 3:50
 "Duke's Fantasy" (Mal Waldron) - 9:07
 "Thriller" (Rod Temperton) - 5:58
 "Night Time (Is the Right Time)" (Lew Herman) - 3:31
 "Vibe Waltz" (Lacy) - 5:09
 "Twilight Dreams" - 6:21
All compositions by Lester Bowie except as indicated
Recorded April 1987 at Rawlston Recording Studios, Brooklyn, NY.

Personnel
Lester Bowie: trumpet
Vincent Chancey: French horn
Frank Lacy: trombone
Steve Turre: trombone
Malachi Thompson: trumpet
Rasul Siddik: trumpet
Stanton Davis: trumpet
Bob Stewart: tuba
Phillip Wilson: drums

References

1987 albums
Lester Bowie albums